Raymond Wiklander is a Swedish former figure skater. Competing in single skating, he won five Swedish national titles and four Nordic bronze medals. He also competed in pair skating. Following a junior-level partnership with Britt-Louis Staffrin, he teamed up with Gun Jonsson and won four consecutive Swedish national senior bronze medals.

Competitive highlights

Single skating

Pair skating with Jonsson

Pair skating with Staffrin

References 

1940s births
Swedish male single skaters
Swedish male pair skaters
Year of birth missing (living people)
Living people